La vie de Jésus (English: The Life of Jesus) is the 1997 debut feature film by director Bruno Dumont. It was the winner of the BFI Sutherland Trophy, the Prix Jean Vigo and European Discovery of the Year at the European Film Awards, as well as the special mention for Camera d’Or at Cannes. Set in the town of Bailleul, the film casts a bleak look at the life of an unemployed teenager with learning difficulties who descends into rape and murder. The choice of title for the film is unexplained.

Plot
Freddy is an unemployed epileptic youth, living with his mother who runs a little bar and sleeping when he can with his girlfriend Marie, who works in a supermarket. When not attending hospital he hangs around with four unemployed boys (the sixth member of the gang is in hospital dying of AIDS). The five are members of an all-male marching band that has an all-female majorettes section and, after a rehearsal, they gang rape one of the girls. Her father publicly denounces them as cowardly rapists. Marie, disgusted at Freddy's behaviour, accepts the advances of Kader, from a North African family. The five abduct Kader, and Freddy kicks him to death. The police inspector denounces him as a cowardly racist murderer.

Production
Director Bruno Dumont confirmed that porn actors were used in the unsimulated sex scene between Freddy's and Marie's characters. "The main actors were replaced by body doubles. I did not like it, towards them. If they had accepted, I would have do. Today, I wouldn't. In all my other films, everything is fake, it's cinema," he said.

Home video release
 La vie de Jésus - Director-approved Masters of Cinema Series edition - Released in the UK 21 July 2008
La vie de Jésus - Director-approved special edition in Blu-Ray and DVD formats, released by the Criterion collection in 2019.

References

External links
 
 MoC Series website for La vie de Jésus 

1997 films
1997 drama films
1990s erotic drama films
1997 directorial debut films
French drama films
1990s French-language films
French erotic drama films
French films about revenge
Films directed by Bruno Dumont
European Film Awards winners (films)
1990s French films